

Events

April events
 April 13 – The Mansfield and Pinxton Railway, a wagonway in the midlands of England, opens for coal traffic.

June events
 June 24 – James Foster and John Urpeth Rastrick partner to form Foster, Rastrick and Company, the English firm that will build the first steam locomotives for the Delaware and Hudson Railroad.

Births

February births 
 February 20 – Alfred Escher, Swiss railway promoter (d. 1882)

October births 
 October 27 – Henry B. Plant, president of the Plant System of railroads (d. 1899).

Deaths

April deaths 
 April 15 – Oliver Evans, pioneering American steam locomotive designer and inventor (b. 1755).

References
 Brief biographies of major mechanical engineers.  Retrieved February 9, 2005.
 Bedwell, Carolyn (2002), John Urpeth Rastrick. Retrieved April 4, 2005.
 Bedwell, Carolyn (2002), John Urpeth Rastrick – Chronology. Retrieved April 22, 2005 — date for Foster, Rastrick and Company formation.
 Senate House Library, University of London, John Bradley & Co (Stourbridge) Ltd., Ironfounders. Retrieved April 22, 2005 — info on Foster, Rastrick and Company, verifies Foster family connections.